Pavel Varfolomevich Kuznetsov (1878–1968) was a painter and graphic artist.

Life and career

He studied at Saratov at Bogolyubov Art School (1891–1896), then Moscow School of Painting, Sculpture and Architecture (1897–1904) and for a year in Paris (1905). His early paintings were exhibited by the Mir Iskusstva group, and he was closely associated with the Russian Symbolists. He helped to organize the Crimson Rose exhibition (1904) and was a founder and leader of the Blue Rose in 1907. He taught at the Stroganov Institute (1917–18; 1945-8) and at the Moscow Institute of Fine Arts (1918–37). He headed the painting section of Narkompros until 1921, but fell out of official favour with the advent of Socialist Realism.

Kuznetsov's early paintings are typical of the Blue Rose group's poetic explorations of an interior, imaginative world through archetypal symbols. After 1910 he drew increasingly on folk culture, continuing to draw on the rich colours and harmonious rhythms of the Symbolists but simplifying his compositions to depict the everyday life of village communities of Kirghizstan in Central Asia.

Works

References 

 Stupples, P., Pavel Kuznetsov: His Life and Art, Cambridge, 1989

References 
 House Museum of Pavel V. Kuznetsov at the Artist's Studio Museum Network

1878 births
1968 deaths
Painters from the Russian Empire
Soviet painters
Orientalist painters
Moscow School of Painting, Sculpture and Architecture alumni
Academic staff of Stroganov Moscow State Academy of Arts and Industry